Beregovoy is a rural locality (a settlement) in Churovskoye Rural Settlement, Sheksninsky District, Vologda Oblast, Russia. The population was 6 as of 2010.

Geography 
Beregovoy is located 20 km north of Sheksna (the district's administrative centre) by road. Myshkino is the nearest rural locality.

References 

Rural localities in Sheksninsky District